Lithuania competed at the 2020 Summer Paralympics in Tokyo, Japan.

Medalists

Athletics

Men's field

Women's field

Goalball

Group stage

Judo

Lithuania have qualified one judoka.

Swimming

One Lithuanian swimmer has successfully entered the paralympic slot after breaking the MQS.

Men's events

See also
Lithuania at the Paralympics
Lithuania at the 2020 Summer Olympics

References

Nations at the 2020 Summer Paralympics
2020
2021 in Lithuanian sport